Lake Hart can refer to:
 Lake Hart, Florida, USA, a community
 Lake Hart, Indiana, USA, a community
 Lake Hart (South Australia), a lake within the Woomera Test Range
 Lake Hart (Winter Haven, Florida), a lake on the south side of Winter Haven, Florida